The 1876 United States presidential election in Kentucky took place on November 7, 1876, as part of the 1876 United States presidential election. Kentucky voters chose twelve representatives, or electors, to the Electoral College, who voted for president and vice president.

Background and vote
The Civil War would shape Kentucky politically for not merely the rest of the nineteenth century but also for the twentieth by creating entrenched divisions between secessionist, Democratic counties and Unionist, Republican ones. The southern cultural hegemony meant state as a whole leaned Democratic throughout the Third Party System and the GOP would never carry the state during that era at either presidential or gubernatorial level.

Kentucky had been one of only six states to vote against popular incumbent Ulysses S. Grant in 1872, and the effects of an economic downturn meant that Democratic nominees Samuel J. Tilden and Thomas A. Hendricks increased their margin by nineteen points. Kentucky would prove Tilden's fourth-strongest state behind Georgia, Texas and Mississippi. Only Lyndon Johnson in 1964, Richard Nixon in 1972, and Donald Trump in 2016 and 2020 have since exceeded Tilden's percentage for either party in the Bluegrass State.

, this is the last occasion when Lewis County voted for a Democratic presidential candidate.

Results

References 

Kentucky
1876
1876 Kentucky elections